Hasan Ali Turkmani (27 January 1935 – 18 July 2012) was a prominent Syrian military commander and Arab Socialist Ba'ath Party member. He served as the minister of defense in Syria from 2004 to 2009.

He and three other top Syrian government officials were killed on 18 July 2012 in Damascus during a bomb attack.

Early life and education
Hasan Turkmani was born in Aleppo in 1935 into a Syrian Sunni Muslim family of Turkmen origin. He attended different courses and a higher military education, including bachelor in military sciences :

 Bachelor in Military Sciences, Infantry Officer, Military Academy of Homs, graduate in 1955,   
 Mechanized Troop and Battalion Command Course, 1963 
 Combined Arms (Infantry and Armour) field command and staff course, 1965
 Higher Field Command and Staff Course, Masters in Military Sciences, 1969
 Higher Staff Course (War College), Doctor of Military Sciences, 1972

Career
Turkmani joined the Syrian Arab Army in 1955 as an infantry officer. He was one of the first officers to graduate on the new mechanized units of the BMP-1 and BTR-60 armoured vehicles. He completed a staff course for combined arms operations from East Germany in 1965, and a Command and Staff Course from Egypt in 1969.  He commanded the 9th Mechanized Infantry Brigade which fought a crucial rearguard action around Damascus in 1973. He was promoted to the rank of major general in 1975. Turkmani also began to serve as a member of the central committee of the Baath Party beginning in 2000. He was the deputy chief of staff in the Syrian army until 2002. He was appointed chief of staff on 23 January 2002, replacing Ali Aslan. Since he is a Sunni Muslim, his appointment was considered as a move to restore a touch of sectarian diversity to Syria's military-intelligence establishment, which had been dominated by Alawite Muslims.

On 12 May 2004, he became defense minister, replacing Mustafa Tlass. On the other hand, Ali Habib Mahmoud succeeded Turkmani as chief of staff. In June 2006, Turkmani visited Tehran and signed a strategic alliance agreement with his Iranian counterpart Mustafa Mohammad Najjar to form a joint defense committee.

Turkmani was replaced in June 2009 by the former army chief Ali Habib Mahmud as defense minister. On 3 June 2009, President Bashar Assad appointed Turkmani as assistant vice president with the rank of minister. He was also appointed chief of crisis operations and was widely blamed for the campaign of torture in Syria. In addition, Turkmani was a military advisor to vice president Farouk Sharaa.

Rumoured death
On 19 May 2012, the Free Syrian Army's (FSA) Damascus council announced that one of their operatives from the FSA's Al Sahabeh battalion had successfully poisoned all eight members of Bashar Assad's Central Crisis Management Cell (CCMC), a group of top military officials who currently run the Syrian army's daily operations. The Free Syrian Army's Damascus council said they believed at least six out of the eight members, including Turkmani, Assef Shawkat, Mohammad al-Shaar, Daoud Rajha, Hisham Ikhtiyar and Mohammad Said Bakhtian, to have been killed. Mohammad al-Shaar, then interior minister, and Hasan Turkmani, then assistant vice president, denied their own deaths to State TV, calling it "categorically baseless".

Personal life
Hasan Turkmani's son Muhammad Bilal owned the weekly political magazine Abyad wa Aswad ("Black and White" in English).

Death and funeral
Hasan Turkmani was assassinated on 18 July 2012 in a bombing by opposition militants on a meeting of the Central Crisis Management Cell (CCMC) at the national security building in Rawda Square, north-west Damascus, where the minister of defense Dawoud Rajiha, his deputy Assef Shawkat and other top officials were also killed. Turkmani died of his wounds after the attack. Dozens of civiliants were injured. A state funeral was held for him, Dawoud Rajiha and Assef Shawkat in Damascus on 20 July 2012.

References

1935 births
2012 deaths
People from Aleppo
Syrian Sunni Muslims
Syrian ministers of defense
Members of the Regional Command of the Arab Socialist Ba'ath Party – Syria Region
Chiefs of Staff of the Syrian Army
Military personnel killed in the Syrian civil war
Assassinated Syrian politicians
Deaths by explosive device
Terrorism deaths in Syria
Assassinated military personnel
2012 murders in Syria
Homs Military Academy alumni